To Aganara Tulasi Mun ( I am the basil of your yard) is an Indian Odia language Soap opera aired on Zee Sarthak. It premiered on 3 July 2013 and ended on 16 March 2019. It is the longest ran Odia soap opera with 1,839 episodes.

Plot 
The story follows the journey of a young girl named Tulasi, who is in love with Chandan. However, Lisa is also smitten by him and wants to marry him. Tulasi decides to stand by Chandan and his family amid oppositions from Lisa and others. How she faces these is the story.

Cast 
 Swetlana Bhattacharya/Lipsa Mishra/Jessy a.k.a. Pralipta Priyadarshini Samalas Tulasi (aka Iccha)
 Tushar as Chandan
 Chhandita as Lisa
 Bhagaban Behera as Dr. Meher
 Rajesh Mishra 
 Aswini Kumar Brahma
 Namrata Das
Anil Kumar Nayak
Gyanendra Kumar Pallai
Mamta Padhi as Nirmala
Biren Mishra

Casting 
Initially, Svetlana played the role of tulsi. After her exit, Jessy replaced her. In 2016, Jessy was arrested on charges of abetment to suicide of telly actor Ranjit Patnaik aka Raja and Lipsa Misra replaced her. But Jessy got bail within 15 days and reentered the serial. Bhagwan Behera who played the main character Dr.Meher has left the serial protesting her entry.

Reception
The series was one of the most watched Odia language television program at its run time. In week 18 and 19 of 2014, it garnered a trp of 3.3 and 3.63 being the second most and most watched Odia language television program in the two weeks.

References

External links 
 To Aganara Tulasi Mun on ZEE5

Indian television soap operas
Odia-language television shows
2013 Indian television series debuts
2019 Indian television series endings
Zee Sarthak original programming